Perry Township is the name of several places in the U.S. state of Pennsylvania:

Perry Township, Armstrong County, Pennsylvania
Perry Township, Berks County, Pennsylvania
Perry Township, Clarion County, Pennsylvania
Perry Township, Fayette County, Pennsylvania
Perry Township, Greene County, Pennsylvania
Perry Township, Jefferson County, Pennsylvania
Perry Township, Lawrence County, Pennsylvania
Perry Township, Mercer County, Pennsylvania
Perry Township, Snyder County, Pennsylvania

Pennsylvania township disambiguation pages